Pişkidağ is a village in the Üzümlü District, Erzincan Province, Turkey. had a population of 283 in 2021.

The hamlet of Gökbayır is attached to the village.

References 

Villages in Üzümlü District